The Man I Love is an album by jazz singer Peggy Lee with an orchestra arranged by Nelson Riddle and conducted by Frank Sinatra. This was Lee's first album after returning to Capitol.

Reception 

Allmusic gave the album three and a half stars. Critic William Ruhlmann wrote that Sinatra directed Lee to sing like Billie Holiday, "to reinforce the near-victimhood of the woman depicted in the songs." Nelson Riddle's "lush strings...hint of dark things" in "a superb pairing of singer, conductor, and arranger".

Track listing 
 "The Man I Love" (George Gershwin, Ira Gershwin) – 3:45
 "Please Be Kind" (Sammy Cahn, Saul Chaplin) – 4:14
 "Happiness Is a Thing Called Joe" (Harold Arlen, Yip Harburg) – 4:05
 "(Just One Way to Say) I Love You" (Irving Berlin) – 2:53
 "That's All" (Alan Brandt, Bob Haymes) – 2:55
 "Something Wonderful" (Oscar Hammerstein II, Richard Rodgers) – 3:15
 "He's My Guy" (Gene de Paul, Don Raye) – 4:13
 "Then I'll Be Tired of You" (Harburg, Arthur Schwartz) – 2:28
 "My Heart Stood Still" (Rodgers, Lorenz Hart) – 2:45
 "If I Should Lose You" (Ralph Rainger, Leo Robin) – 2:23
 "There Is No Greater Love" (Isham Jones, Marty Symes) – 3:38
 "The Folks Who Live on the Hill" (Hammerstein, Jerome Kern) – 3:37

Personnel 
 Peggy Lee – vocals

References 

1957 albums
Peggy Lee albums
Capitol Records albums
Albums produced by Milt Gabler
Albums conducted by Frank Sinatra
Albums arranged by Nelson Riddle